Robert Hendrickson may refer to:

Robert Hendrickson (director) (1944–2016), film director
Robert C. Hendrickson (1898–1964), U.S. Senator from New Jersey
 Robert Hendrickson, Rector, St Philip's in the Hills Episcopal Church, Tucson, Arizona